John Arthur Hayes (11 January 1927 – 25 December 2007) was a New Zealand Test cricketer who played 15 Test matches for the country between 1951 and 1958. Primarily a fast bowler bowling late away-swingers with a high action, he took 30 wickets in Tests. Perhaps his finest moment was taking 11 wickets for the New Zealanders against MCC at Lord's in 1958.

Cricket career
Hayes was born in Auckland. He made his first-class debut for Auckland in December 1946. After only two first-class matches, and with the team looking for someone to support the aging Jack Cowie, he played in a trial match in January 1949 for the New Zealand side that toured England that year. He took five wickets for 73, and was selected for the tour led by Walter Hadlee. He took 26 wickets at a bowling average of 33 before a groin injury in July ruled him out for the remainder of the tour. John Reid rated him as the fastest bowler of the 1949 English season.

Nicknamed "Haybag", he made his Test debut against England at Christchurch in March 1951. He played against the touring West Indies team in 1951–52, but his job obliged him to miss the tour to South Africa in 1953–54. He played at home again against the touring English team in 1954–55, and toured to Pakistan and India in 1955–56. He missed playing in New Zealand's first Test victory, against the West Indies at Auckland in March 1956, and played his last four Tests on the tour to England in 1958, ending his Test career in the Fourth Test at Old Trafford. He was never on the winning side in a Test Match.

Hayes was New Zealand Cricket Almanack's Player of the Year in 1958. He played his last first-class match for the New Zealand Governor-General's XI against the touring MCC in Auckland in February 1961.

After cricket
Outside cricket, he worked for a firm of importers and exporters in Auckland. In the 1980s and 1990s, he served as Morocco's honorary consul in New Zealand.  He died in Auckland.

References

External links
 Obituary - NZ Cricket
 Obituary - The Daily Telegraph - 4 January 2008

1927 births
2007 deaths
New Zealand cricketers
New Zealand Test cricketers
Auckland cricketers
Canterbury cricketers
South Island cricketers